Gyula Marsovszky (3 January 1936 – 17 December 2004) was a Swiss professional Grand Prix motorcycle road racer of Hungarian descent. His best years were the 1968 500cc world championship season, when he rode a Matchless motorcycle to third place behind Giacomo Agostini and Jack Findlay, then in 1969 when he finished second to Agostini, this time riding a Linto. In 1971, he won his first and only Grand Prix race when he triumphed at the 250cc Nations Grand Prix held at Monza.

Grand Prix motorcycle racing results 
Points system from 1950 to 1968:

Points system from 1969 onwards:

(key) (Races in bold indicate pole position; races in italics indicate fastest lap)

References 

1936 births
2004 deaths
Swiss motorcycle racers
Swiss people of Hungarian descent
250cc World Championship riders
350cc World Championship riders
500cc World Championship riders
Isle of Man TT riders